Gearóidín Breathnach is an Irish singer that originally grew up in Rannafast, in the Rosses, County Donegal; she now lives in Ardveen, also in the Rosses. As a sean-nós singer, she has been a double winner of the Corn Uí Riada competition in Oireachtas na Gaeilge.
Gearóidín is also a seanchaí. Her father Neddie Frank Mac Griana was also a seanchaí, and was a source of her inspiration and love for traditional Irish culture.

See also
 Breathnach

References

Year of birth missing (living people)
Living people
Irish folk singers
Irish-language singers
People from Gweedore
20th-century Irish women singers
21st-century Irish women singers